Roberts Inn, is a historic home and farm located at Cooksville, Howard County, Maryland. The complex consists of a -story stuccoed stone house with a reconstructed log wing built about 1808, and several 19th- to early-20th-century agricultural outbuildings, including a frame bank barn, a frame ground barn, a tile dairy, and a frame silo. The construction of the house coincided with the extension of the National Pike through the Cooksville area. Documentary and architectural evidence supports its use as a turnpike tavern from an early date. Tradition holds that Marquis de Lafayette breakfasted at Roberts Inn during his 1824 tour of America.

It was listed on the National Register of Historic Places in 2006. 
It is located off of Route 144 next to the Dunkin Donuts off the intersection of Route 144 and Route 97.

See also
List of Howard County properties in the Maryland Historical Trust
Red House Tavern

References

External links
, including photo from 2001, at Maryland Historical Trust

Cooksville, Maryland
Houses on the National Register of Historic Places in Maryland
Howard County, Maryland landmarks
Houses in Howard County, Maryland
National Register of Historic Places in Howard County, Maryland